The Arab–Israeli conflict is an ongoing intercommunal phenomenon involving political tension, military conflicts, and other disputes between Arab countries and Israel, which escalated during the 20th century, but had mostly faded out by the early 21st century. The roots of the Arab–Israeli conflict have been attributed to the support by Arab League member countries for the Palestinians, a fellow League member, in the ongoing Israeli–Palestinian conflict; this in turn has been attributed to the simultaneous rise of Zionism and Arab nationalism towards the end of the 19th century, though the two national movements had not clashed until the 1920s.

Part of the Palestine–Israel conflict arose from the conflicting claims by these movements to the land that formed the British Mandatory Palestine, which was regarded by the Jewish people as their ancestral homeland, while at the same time it was regarded by the Pan-Arab movement as historically and currently belonging to the Arab Palestinians, and in the Pan-Islamic context, as Muslim lands. The sectarian conflict within the British Mandate territory between Palestinian Jews and Arabs escalated into a full-scale Palestinian civil war in 1947. Taking the side of the Palestinian Arabs, especially following the Israeli Declaration of Independence, the neighbouring Arab countries invaded the by-then former Mandate territory in May 1948, commencing the First Arab–Israeli War. Large-scale hostilities mostly ended with ceasefire agreements after the 1973 Yom Kippur War. Peace agreements were signed between Israel and Egypt in 1979, resulting in Israeli withdrawal from the Sinai Peninsula and the abolition of the military governance system in the West Bank and Gaza Strip, in favor of Israeli Civil Administration and consequent unilateral annexation of the Golan Heights and East Jerusalem.

The nature of the conflict has shifted over the years from the large-scale, regional Arab–Israeli conflict to a more local Israeli–Palestinian conflict, which peaked during the 1982 Lebanon War when Israel intervened in the Lebanese Civil War to oust the Palestinian Liberation Organization from Lebanon. By 1983, Israel reached normalization with Christian-dominated Lebanese government, but the agreement was annulled the next year with Muslim and Druze militias' takeover of Beirut. With the decline of the 1987–1993 First Palestinian Intifada, the interim Oslo Accords led to the creation of the Palestinian National Authority in 1994, within the context of the Israeli–Palestinian peace process. The same year, Israel and Jordan reached a peace accord. In 2002, the Arab League offered recognition of Israel by Arab countries as part of the resolution of the Palestine–Israel conflict in the Arab Peace Initiative. The initiative, which has been reconfirmed since, calls for normalizing relations between the Arab League and Israel, in exchange for a full withdrawal by Israel from the occupied territories (including East Jerusalem) and a "just settlement" of the Palestinian refugee problem based on UN Resolution 194. In the 1990s and early 2000s, a cease-fire had been largely maintained between Israel and Baathist Syria, as well as with Lebanon. Despite the peace agreements with Egypt and Jordan, the interim peace accords with the Palestinian Authority and the generally existing cease-fire, until the mid-2010s the Arab League and Israel had remained at odds with each other over many issues. Among Arab belligerents in the conflict, Iraq and Syria are the only states who have reached no formal peace accord or treaty with Israel, both however turning to support Iran.

Developments in the course of the Syrian Civil War reshuffled the situation near Israel's northern border, putting the Syrian Arab Republic, Hezbollah and the Syrian opposition at odds with each other and complicating their relations with Israel, upon the emerging warfare with Iran. The conflict between Israel and Hamas-ruled Gaza, is also attributed to the Iran–Israel proxy conflict in the region. By 2017, Israel and several Arab Sunni states led by Saudi Arabia formed a semi-official coalition to confront Iran. This move and the Israeli normalization with Gulf States was marked by some as the fading of the Arab–Israeli conflict.

Background

Religious aspects of the conflict
The Arab–Israeli conflict has a religious aspect. The beliefs of the various sides and their ideas and views of the chosen people in their policies with regard to the "Promised Land" and the "Chosen City" of Jerusalem.

The Land of Canaan or Eretz Yisrael (Land of Israel) was, according to the Hebrew Bible, promised by God to the Children of Israel. This is also mentioned in the Qur'an. In his 1896 manifesto, The Jewish State, Theodor Herzl repeatedly refers to the Biblical Promised Land concept. Likud is currently the most prominent Israeli political party to include the Biblical claim to the Land of Israel in its platform.

Muslims also claim rights to that land in accordance with the Quran. Contrary to the Jewish claim that this land was promised only to the descendants of Abraham's grandson Jacob (Yisrael), they argue that the Land of Canaan was promised to what they consider the elder son of Abraham, Ishmael, from whom Arabs claim descent. Additionally, Muslims also revere many sites also holy for Biblical Israelites, such as the Cave of the Patriarchs and the Temple Mount. In the past 1,400 years, Muslims have constructed Islamic landmarks on these ancient Israelite sites, such as the Dome of the Rock and the Al-Aqsa Mosque on the Temple Mount, the holiest site in Judaism. This has brought the two groups into conflict over the rightful possession of Jerusalem. Muslim teaching is that Muhammad passed through Jerusalem on his first journey to heaven. Hamas, which governs the Gaza Strip, claims that all of the land of Palestine (the current Israeli and Palestinian territories) is an Islamic waqf that must be governed by Muslims.

Christian Zionists often support the State of Israel because of the ancestral right of the Jews to the Holy Land, as suggested, for instance, by the apostle Paul in his letter to the Romans, chapter 11, in the Bible. Christian Zionism teaches that the return of Jews to Israel is a prerequisite for the Second Coming of Christ.

National movements
The roots of the modern Arab–Israeli conflict lie in the rise of Zionism and the reactionary Arab nationalism that arose in response to Zionism towards the end of the 19th century. Territory regarded by the Jewish people as their historical homeland is also regarded by the Pan-Arab movement as historically and presently belonging to the Palestinian Arabs. Before World War I, the Middle East, including Palestine (later Mandatory Palestine), had been under the control of the Ottoman Empire for nearly 400 years. During the closing years of their empire, the Ottomans began to espouse their Turkish ethnic identity, asserting the primacy of Turks within the empire, leading to discrimination against the Arabs. The promise of liberation from the Ottomans led many Jews and Arabs to support the allied powers during World War I, leading to the emergence of widespread Arab nationalism. Both Arab nationalism and Zionism had their formulative beginning in Europe. The Zionist Congress was established in Basel in 1897, while the "Arab Club" was established in Paris in 1906.

In the late 19th century European and Middle Eastern Jewish communities began to increasingly immigrate to Palestine and purchase land from the local Ottoman landlords. The population of the late 19th century in Palestine reached 600,000 – mostly Muslim Arabs, but also significant minorities of Jews, Christians, Druze and some Samaritans and Baháʼís. At that time, Jerusalem did not extend beyond the walled area and had a population of only a few tens of thousands. Collective farms, known as kibbutzim, were established, as was the first entirely Jewish city in modern times, Tel Aviv.

During 1915–16, as World War I was underway, the British High Commissioner in Egypt, Sir Henry McMahon, secretly corresponded with Husayn ibn 'Ali, the patriarch of the Hashemite family and Ottoman governor of Mecca and Medina. McMahon convinced Husayn to lead an Arab revolt against the Ottoman Empire, which was aligned with Germany against Britain and France in the war. McMahon promised that if the Arabs supported Britain in the war, the British government would support the establishment of an independent Arab state under Hashemite rule in the Arab provinces of the Ottoman Empire, including Palestine. The Arab revolt, led by T. E. Lawrence ("Lawrence of Arabia") and Husayn's son Faysal, was successful in defeating the Ottomans, and Britain took control over much of this area.

Sectarian conflict in Mandatory Palestine

First mandate years and the Franco-Syrian war
In 1917, Palestine was conquered by the British forces (including the Jewish Legion). The British government issued the Balfour Declaration, which stated that the government viewed favorably "the establishment in Palestine of a national home for the Jewish people" but "that nothing shall be done which may prejudice the civil and religious rights of existing non-Jewish communities in Palestine". The Declaration was issued as a result of the belief of key members of the government, including Prime Minister David Lloyd George, that Jewish support was essential to winning the war; however, the declaration caused great disquiet in the Arab world. After the war, the area came under British rule as the British Mandate of Palestine. The area mandated to the British in 1923 included what is today Israel, the West Bank and Gaza Strip. Transjordan eventually was carved into a separate British protectorate – the Emirate of Transjordan, which gained an autonomous status in 1928 and achieved complete independence in 1946 with the approval by the United Nations of the end of the British Mandate.

A major crisis among the Arab nationalists took place with the failed establishment of the Arab Kingdom of Syria in 1920. With the disastrous outcome of the Franco-Syrian War, the self-proclaimed Hashemite kingdom with its capital in Damascus was defeated and the Hashemite ruler took refuge in Mandatory Iraq. The crisis saw the first confrontation of nationalist Arab and Jewish forces, taking place in the Battle of Tel Hai in March 1920, but more importantly the collapse of the pan-Arabist kingdom led to the establishment of the local Palestinian version of Arab nationalism, with the return of Amin al-Husseini from Damascus to Jerusalem in late 1920.

At this point in time Jewish immigration to Mandatory Palestine continued, while to some opinions a similar, but less documented, immigration also took place in the Arab sector, bringing workers from Syria and other neighbouring areas. Palestinian Arabs saw this rapid influx of Jewish immigrants as a threat to their homeland and their identity as a people. Moreover, Jewish policies of purchasing land and prohibiting the employment of Arabs in Jewish-owned industries and farms greatly angered the Palestinian Arab communities. Demonstrations were held as early as 1920, protesting what the Arabs felt were unfair preferences for the Jewish immigrants set forth by the British mandate that governed Palestine at the time. This resentment led to outbreaks of violence later that year, as the al-Husseini incited riots broke out in Jerusalem. Winston Churchill's 1922 White Paper tried to reassure the Arab population, denying that the creation of a Jewish state was the intention of the Balfour Declaration.

1929 events
In 1929, after a demonstration by Vladimir Jabotinsky's political group Betar at the Western Wall, riots started in Jerusalem and expanded throughout Mandatory Palestine; Arabs murdered 67 Jews in the city of Hebron, in what became known as the Hebron massacre. During the week of the 1929 riots, at least 116 Arabs and 133 Jews were killed and 339 wounded.

1930s and 1940s

By 1931, 17 percent of the population of Mandatory Palestine were Jews, an increase of six percent since 1922. Jewish immigration peaked soon after the Nazis came to power in Germany, causing the Jewish population in British Palestine to double.

In the mid-1930s Izz ad-Din al-Qassam arrived from Syria and established the Black Hand, an anti-Zionist and anti-British militant organization. He recruited and arranged military training for peasants, and by 1935 he had enlisted between 200 and 800 men. The cells were equipped with bombs and firearms, which they used to kill Jewish settlers in the area, as well as engaging in a campaign of vandalism of Jewish settler plantations. By 1936, escalating tensions led to the 1936–1939 Arab revolt in Palestine.

In response to Arab pressure, the British Mandate authorities greatly reduced the number of Jewish immigrants to Palestine (see White Paper of 1939 and the ). These restrictions remained in place until the end of the mandate, a period which coincided with the Nazi Holocaust and the flight of Jewish refugees from Europe. As a consequence, most Jewish entrants to Mandatory Palestine were considered illegal (see Aliyah Bet), causing further tensions in the region. Following several failed attempts to solve the problem diplomatically, the British asked the newly formed United Nations for help. On 15 May 1947, the General Assembly appointed a committee, the UNSCOP, composed of representatives from eleven states. To make the committee more neutral, none of the Great Powers were represented. After five weeks of in-country study, the Committee reported to the General Assembly on 3 September 1947. The Report contained a majority and a minority plan. The majority proposed a Plan of Partition with Economic Union. The minority proposed The Independent State of Palestine. With only slight modifications, the Plan of Partition with Economic Union was the one the adoption and implementation of which was recommended in resolution 181(II) of 29 November 1947. The Resolution was adopted by 33 votes to 13 with 10 abstentions. All six Arab states who were UN-members voted against it. On the ground, Arab and Jewish Palestinians were fighting openly to control strategic positions in the region. Several major atrocities were committed by both sides.

Civil war in Mandatory Palestine

In the weeks prior to the end of the mandate the Haganah launched a number of offensives in which they gained control over all the territory allocated by the UN to the Jewish State, creating a large number of refugees and capturing the towns of Tiberias, Haifa, Safad, Beisan and, in effect, Jaffa.

Early in 1948 the United Kingdom announced its firm intention to terminate its mandate in Palestine on 14 May. In response, US President Harry S. Truman made a statement on 25 March proposing UN trusteeship rather than partition, stating that "unfortunately, it has become clear that the partition plan cannot be carried out at this time by peaceful means. ... unless emergency action is taken, there will be no public authority in Palestine on that date capable of preserving law and order. Violence and bloodshed will descend upon the Holy Land. Large-scale fighting among the people of that country will be the inevitable result."

History

1948 Arab–Israeli War

On 14 May 1948, the day on which the British Mandate over Palestine expired, the Jewish People's Council gathered at the Tel Aviv Museum and approved a proclamation that declared the establishment of a Jewish state in Eretz Israel, to be known as the State of Israel. The declaration was made by David Ben-Gurion, the Executive Head of the World Zionist Organization.

There were no mention of the borders of the new state other than that it was in Eretz Israel. An official cablegram from the Secretary-General of the League of Arab States to the UN Secretary-General on 15 May 1948 stated publicly that Arab Governments found "themselves compelled to intervene for the sole purpose of restoring peace and security and establishing law and order in Palestine" (Clause 10(e)). Further in Clause 10(e): "The Governments of the Arab States hereby confirm at this stage the view that had been repeatedly declared by them on previous occasions, such as the London Conference and before the United Nations mainly, the only fair and just solution to the problem of Palestine is the creation of United State of Palestine based upon the democratic principles ..."

That day, the armies of Egypt, Lebanon, Syria, Jordan and Iraq invaded what had just ceased to be the British Mandate, marking the beginning of the 1948 Arab–Israeli War. The nascent Israeli Defense Force repulsed the Arab nations from part of the occupied territories, thus extending its borders beyond the original UNSCOP partition. By December 1948, Israel controlled most of the portion of Mandate Palestine west of the Jordan River. The remainder of the Mandate consisted of Jordan, the area that came to be called the West Bank (controlled by Jordan), and the Gaza Strip (controlled by Egypt). Prior to and during this conflict, 713,000 Palestinian Arabs fled their original lands to become Palestinian refugees, in part due to a promise from Arab leaders that they would be able to return when the war had been won, and also in part due to attacks on Palestinian villages and towns by Israeli forces and Jewish militant groups. Many Palestinians fled from the areas that are now Israel as a response to massacres of Arab towns by militant Jewish organizations like the Irgun and the Lehi (group) (See Deir Yassin massacre). The War came to an end with the signing of the 1949 Armistice Agreements between Israel and each of its Arab neighbours.

The status of Jewish citizens in Arab states worsened during the 1948 Israeli-Arab war. Anti-Jewish riots erupted throughout the Arab World in December 1947, and Jewish communities were hit particularly hard in Aleppo and British-controlled Aden, with hundreds of dead and injured. In Libya, Jews were deprived of citizenship, and in Iraq, their property was seized. Egypt expelled most of its foreign community, including Jews, after the Suez War 1956, while Algeria denied its French citizens, including Jews, of citizenship upon its independence in 1962. Over the course of twenty years, some 850,000 Jews from Arab countries immigrated to Israel and other countries.

1949–1967
As a result of Israel's victory in the 1948 Arab–Israeli War, any Arabs caught on the wrong side of the ceasefire line were unable to return to their homes in what became Israel. Likewise, any Jews on the West Bank or in Gaza were exiled from their property and homes to Israel. Today's Palestinian refugees are the descendants of those who left, the responsibility for their exodus being a matter of dispute between the Israeli and the Palestinian side. Historian Benny Morris has claimed that the "decisive cause" for the abandonment by Palestinian Arabs of their settlements was predominantly related to, or caused by, actions of the Jewish forces (citing actual physical expulsions, military assaults on settlements, fear of being caught up in fighting, the fall of nearby settlements, and propaganda inciting flight), while abandonment due to orders by the Arab leadership was decisive in only six out of the 392 depopulated Arab settlements analysed by him. Over 700,000 Jews emigrated to Israel between 1948 and 1952, with approximately 285,000 of them from Arab countries.

In 1956, Egypt closed the Straits of Tiran to Israeli shipping, and blockaded the Gulf of Aqaba, in contravention of the Constantinople Convention of 1888. Many argued that this was also a violation of the 1949 Armistice Agreements. On 26 July 1956, Egypt nationalized the Suez Canal Company, and closed the canal to Israeli shipping. Israel responded on 29 October 1956, by invading the Sinai Peninsula with British and French military support. During the Suez Crisis, Israel captured the Gaza Strip and Sinai Peninsula. The United States and the United Nations soon pressured it into a ceasefire. Israel agreed to withdraw from Egyptian territory. Egypt agreed to freedom of navigation in the region and the demilitarization of the Sinai. The United Nations Emergency Force (UNEF) was created and deployed to oversee the demilitarization. The UNEF was only deployed on the Egyptian side of the border, as Israel refused to allow them on its territory.

Israel completed work on a national water carrier, a huge engineering project designed to transfer Israel's allocation of the Jordan river's waters towards the south of the country in realization of Ben-Gurion's dream of mass Jewish settlement of the Negev desert. The Arabs responded by trying to divert the headwaters of the Jordan, leading to growing conflict between Israel and Syria.

The PLO (Palestinian Liberation Organization) was first established in 1964, under a charter including a commitment to "[t]he liberation of Palestine [which] will destroy the Zionist and imperialist presence..." (PLO Charter, Article 22, 1968).

On 19 May 1967, Egypt expelled UNEF observers, and deployed 100,000 soldiers in the Sinai Peninsula. It again closed the Straits of Tiran to Israeli shipping, returning the region to the way it was in 1956 when Israel was blockaded.

On 30 May 1967, Jordan signed a mutual defense pact with Egypt. Egypt mobilized Sinai units, crossing UN lines (after having expelled the UN border monitors) and mobilized and massed on Israel's southern border. On 5 June, Israel launched an attack on Egypt. The Israeli Air Force (IAF) destroyed most of the Egyptian Air Force in a surprise attack, then turned east to destroy the Jordanian, Syrian and Iraqi air forces. This strike was the crucial element in Israel's victory in the Six-Day War. At the war's end, Israel had gained control of the Sinai Peninsula, the Gaza Strip, the West Bank (including East Jerusalem), Shebaa farms, and the Golan Heights. The results of the war affect the geopolitics of the region to this day.

1967–1973

At the end of August 1967, Arab leaders met in Khartoum in response to the war, to discuss the Arab position toward Israel. They reached consensus that there should be no recognition, no peace, and no negotiations with the State of Israel, the so-called "three no's", which according to Abd al Azim Ramadan, left only one option a war with Israel.

In 1969, Egypt initiated the War of Attrition, with the goal of exhausting Israel into surrendering the Sinai Peninsula. The war ended following Gamal Abdel Nasser's death in 1970. Once Sadat took over, he tried to forge positive relations with the US, hoping that they would put pressure on Israel to return the land, by expelling 15,000 Russian advisors from Egypt.

On 6 October 1973, Syria and Egypt staged a surprise attack on Israel on Yom Kippur, the holiest day of the Jewish calendar. The Israeli military were caught off guard and unprepared, and took about three days to fully mobilize. This led other Arab states to send troops to reinforce the Egyptians and Syrians. In addition, these Arab countries agreed to enforce an oil embargo on industrial nations including the U.S., Japan and Western European Countries. These OPEC countries increased the price of oil fourfold, and used it as a political weapon to gain support against Israel. The Yom Kippur War accommodated indirect confrontation between the US and the Soviet Union. When Israel had turned the tide of war, the USSR threatened military intervention. The United States, wary of nuclear war, secured a ceasefire on 25 October.

1974–2000

Egypt

Following the Camp David Accords of the late 1970s, Israel and Egypt signed a peace treaty in March 1979. Under its terms, the Sinai Peninsula returned to Egyptian hands, and the Gaza Strip remained under Israeli control, to be included in a future Palestinian state. The agreement also provided for the free passage of Israeli ships through the Suez Canal and recognition of the Straits of Tiran and the Gulf of Aqaba as international waterways.

Jordan

In October 1994, Israel and Jordan signed a peace agreement, which stipulated mutual cooperation, an end of hostilities, the fixing of the Israel-Jordan border, and a resolution of other issues. The conflict between them had cost roughly 18.3 billion dollars. Its signing is also closely linked with the efforts to create peace between Israel and the Palestine Liberation Organization (PLO) representing the Palestinian National Authority (PNA). It was signed at the southern border crossing of Arabah on 26 October 1994 and made Jordan only the second Arab country (after Egypt) to sign a peace accord with Israel.

Iraq

Israel and Iraq have been implacable foes since 1948. Iraq sent its troops to participate in the 1948 Arab–Israeli War, and later backed Egypt and Syria in the 1967 Six-Day War and in the 1973 Yom Kippur War.

In June 1981, Israel attacked and destroyed newly built Iraqi nuclear facilities in Operation Opera.

During the Gulf War in 1991, Iraq fired 39 Scud missiles into Israel, in the hopes of uniting the Arab world against the coalition which sought to liberate Kuwait. At the behest of the United States, Israel did not respond to this attack in order to prevent a greater outbreak of war.

Lebanon

In 1970, following an extended civil war, King Hussein expelled the Palestine Liberation Organization from Jordan. September 1970 is known as the Black September in Arab history and sometimes is referred to as the "era of regrettable events". It was a month when Hashemite King Hussein of Jordan moved to quash the autonomy of Palestinian organisations and restore his monarchy's rule over the country. The violence resulted in the deaths of tens of thousands of people, the vast majority Palestinians. Armed conflict lasted until July 1971 with the expulsion of the PLO and thousands of Palestinian fighters to Lebanon.

The PLO resettled in Lebanon, where it began to extend a de facto autonomous rule and from which it staged raids into Israel. PLO was one of the major factors for sectarian destabilization of Lebanon and the eruption of the Lebanese Civil War in 1975. In 1978, Israel launched Operation Litani, in which it together with the Free Lebanon Army forced the PLO to retreat north of the Litani river. In 1981 another conflict between Israel and the PLO broke out, which ended with a ceasefire agreement that did not solve the core of the conflict. In June 1982, Israel invaded Lebanon in alliance with Christian factions of the Lebanese government. Within two months the PLO agreed to withdraw thence.

In March 1983, Israel and Lebanon signed a normalization agreement. However, Syria pressured President Amine Gemayel into nullifying the truce in March 1984, following . By 1985, Israeli forces withdrew to a 15 km wide southern strip of Lebanon, following which the conflict continued on a lower scale, with relatively low casualties on both sides. In 1993 and 1996, Israel launched major operations against the Shiite militia of Hezbollah, which had become an emergent threat. In May 2000, the newly elected government of Ehud Barak authorized a withdrawal from Southern Lebanon, fulfilling an election promise to do so well ahead of a declared deadline. The hasty withdrawal lead to the immediate collapse of the South Lebanon Army, and many members either got arrested or fled to Israel.

Palestinians

The 1970s were marked by a large number of major, international terrorist attacks, including the Lod Airport massacre and the Munich Olympics Massacre in 1972, and the Entebbe Hostage Taking in 1976, with over 100 Jewish hostages of different nationalities kidnapped and held in Uganda.

In December 1987, the First Intifada began. The First Intifada was a mass Palestinian uprising against Israeli rule in the Palestinian territories. The rebellion began in the Jabalia refugee camp and quickly spread throughout Gaza and the West Bank. Palestinian actions ranged from civil disobedience to violence. In addition to general strikes, boycotts on Israeli products, graffiti and barricades, Palestinian demonstrations that included stone-throwing by youths against the Israel Defense Forces brought the Intifada international attention. The Israeli army's heavy handed response to the demonstrations, with live ammunition, beatings and mass arrests, brought international condemnation. The PLO, which until then had never been recognised as the leaders of the Palestinian people by Israel, was invited to peace negotiations the following year, after it recognized Israel and renounced terrorism.

In mid-1993, Israeli and Palestinian representatives engaged in peace talks in Oslo, Norway. As a result, in September 1993, Israel and the PLO signed the Oslo Accords, known as the Declaration of Principles or Oslo I. In side letters, Israel recognized the PLO as the legitimate representative of the Palestinian people, while the PLO recognized the right of the state of Israel to exist and renounced terrorism, violence and its desire for the destruction of Israel.

The Oslo II agreement was signed in 1995 and detailed the division of the West Bank into Areas A, B, and C. Area A was land under full Palestinian civilian control, and Palestinians were also responsible for internal security. The Oslo agreements remain important documents in Israeli-Palestinian relations.

2000–2005
The Al-Aqsa Intifada forced Israel to rethink its relationship and policies towards the Palestinians. Following a series of suicide bombings and attacks, the Israeli army launched Operation Defensive Shield in March 2002. It was the largest military operation conducted by Israel since the Six-Day War.

As violence between the Israeli army and Palestinian militants intensified, Israel expanded its security apparatus around the West Bank by re-taking many parts of land in Area A. Israel established a complicated system of roadblocks and checkpoints around major Palestinian areas to deter violence and protect Israeli settlements. However, since 2008, the IDF has slowly transferred authority to Palestinian security forces.

Israel's then prime minister Ariel Sharon began a policy of disengagement from the Gaza Strip in 2003. This policy was fully implemented in August 2005. Sharon's announcement to disengage from Gaza came as a tremendous shock to his critics both on the left and on the right. A year previously, he had commented that the fate of the most far-flung settlements in Gaza, Netzararem and Kfar Darom, was regarded in the same light as that of Tel Aviv. The formal announcements to evacuate seventeen Gaza settlements and another four in the West Bank in February 2004 represented the first reversal for the settler movement since 1968, dividing Sharon's party. It was strongly supported by Trade and Industry Minister Ehud Olmert and Tzipi Livni, the Minister for Immigration and Absorption, but Foreign Minister Silvan Shalom and Finance Minister Benjamin Netanyahu strongly condemned it. It was also uncertain at the time whether this was simply the beginning of further evacuation.

Shift to Iranian conflict (2006–2010s)

Conflict with Hamas and Hezbollah
In June 2006, Hamas militants infiltrated an army post near the Israeli side of the Gaza Strip and abducted Israeli soldier Gilad Shalit. Two IDF soldiers were killed in the attack, while Shalit was wounded after his tank was hit with an RPG. Three days later Israel launched Operation Summer Rains to secure the release of Shalit. He was held hostage by Hamas, who barred the International Red Cross from seeing him, until 18 October 2011, when he was exchanged for 1,027 Palestinian prisoners.

In July 2006, Hezbollah fighters crossed the border from Lebanon into Israel, attacked and killed eight Israeli soldiers, and abducted two others as hostages, setting off the 2006 Lebanon War which caused much destruction in Lebanon. A UN-sponsored ceasefire went into effect on 14 August 2006, officially ending the conflict. The conflict killed over a thousand Lebanese and over 150 Israelis, severely damaged Lebanese civil infrastructure, and displaced approximately one million Lebanese and 300,000–500,000 Israelis, although most were able to return to their homes. After the ceasefire, some parts of Southern Lebanon remained uninhabitable due to Israeli unexploded cluster bomblets.

In the aftermath of the Battle of Gaza, where Hamas seized control of the Gaza Strip in a violent civil war with rival Fatah, Israel placed restrictions on its border with Gaza and ended economic cooperation with the Palestinian leadership based there. Israel and Egypt have imposed a blockade of the Gaza Strip since 2007. Israel maintains the blockade is necessary to limit Palestinian rocket attacks from Gaza and to prevent Hamas from smuggling advanced rockets and weapons capable of hitting its cities.

On 6 September 2007, in Operation Orchard, Israel bombed an eastern Syrian complex which was allegedly a nuclear reactor being built with assistance from North Korea. Israel had also bombed Syria in 2003.

In April 2008, Syrian President Bashar al-Assad told a Qatari newspaper that Syria and Israel had been discussing a peace treaty for a year, with Turkey as a go-between. This was confirmed in May 2008 by a spokesman for Prime Minister Ehud Olmert. As well as a peace treaty, the future of the Golan Heights was discussed. President Assad said "there would be no direct negotiations with Israel until a new US president takes office."

Speaking in Jerusalem on 26 August 2008, then United States Secretary of State Condoleezza Rice criticized Israel's increased settlement construction in the West Bank as detrimental to the peace process. Rice's comments came amid reports that Israeli construction in the disputed territory had increased by a factor of 1.8 over 2007 levels.

A fragile six-month truce between Hamas and Israel expired on 19 December 2008; attempts at extending the truce failed amid accusations of breaches from both sides. Following the expiration, Israel launched a raid on a tunnel suspected of being used to kidnap Israeli soldiers, which killed several Hamas fighters. Following this, Hamas resumed rocket and mortar attacks on Israeli cities, most notably firing over 60 rockets on 24 December. On 27 December 2008, Israel launched Operation Cast Lead against Hamas. Numerous human rights organizations accused Israel and Hamas of committing war crimes.

In 2009 Israel placed a 10-month settlement freeze on the West Bank. Then United States Secretary of State Hillary Clinton praised the freeze as an "unprecedented" gesture that could "help revive Middle East talks."

A raid was carried out by Israeli naval forces on six ships of the Gaza Freedom Flotilla in May 2010 after the ships refused to dock at Port Ashdod. On the MV Mavi Marmara, activists clashed with the Israeli boarding party. During the fighting, nine activists were killed by Israeli special forces. Widespread international condemnation of and reaction to the raid followed, Israel–Turkey relations were strained, and Israel subsequently eased its blockade on the Gaza Strip. Several dozen other passengers and seven Israeli soldiers were injured, with some of the commandos suffering from gunshot wounds.

Following the 2010-2011 round of peace talks between Israel and the Palestinian Authority, 13 Palestinian militant movements led by Hamas initiated a terror campaign designed to derail and disrupt the negotiations. Attacks on Israelis increased after August 2010, when 4 Israeli civilians were killed by Hamas militants.
Palestinian militants also increased the frequency of rocket attacks aimed at Israelis. On 2 August 2010, Hamas militants launched seven Katyusha rockets at Eilat and Aqaba, killing one Jordanian civilian and wounding 4 others.

Intermittent fighting continued since then, including 680 rocket attacks on Israel in 2011. On 14 November 2012, Israel killed Ahmed Jabari, a leader of Hamas's military wing, launching Operation Pillar of Cloud. Hamas and Israel agreed to an Egyptian-mediated ceasefire on 21 November.

The Palestinian Centre for Human Rights said that 158 Palestinians were killed during the operation, of which: 102 were civilians, 55 were militants and one was a policeman; 30 were children and 13 were women. B'Tselem stated that according to its initial findings, which covered only the period between 14 and 19 November 102 Palestinians were killed in the Gaza Strip, 40 of them civilians. According to Israeli figures, 120 combatants and 57 civilians were killed. International outcry ensued, with many criticizing Israel for what much of the international community perceived as a disproportionately violent response. However, the governments of the United States, United Kingdom, Canada, Germany, France, Australia, Belgium, Bulgaria, Czech Republic and Netherlands expressed support for Israel's right to defend itself, and/or condemned the Hamas rocket attacks on Israel.

Following an escalation of rocket attacks by Hamas, Israel started an operation in the Gaza Strip on 8 July 2014. In May 2021, another round of fighting took place in Gaza, lasting eleven days.

During Syrian Civil War

Israel's military role in the Syrian Civil War has been limited to missile strikes, which until 2017 were not officially acknowledged. While the Israeli official position is neutrality in the conflict, Israel is opposed to Iran's presence in Syria. Israel has provided humanitarian aid to Syrian war victims, an effort that was drastically geared up since June 2016 when the Operation Good Neighbour was launched by the Israeli military. There are many different national interests playing a role in the war. One of them is Iran, which Israel is concerned could gain too much regional influence. Iranian proxies such as Hezbollah are suspected of carrying out attacks against Israeli positions on the borders to Syria and Lebanon, and Israel is suspected of carrying out air strikes against convoys transporting weapons to such organisations.

On 9 December 2017, US president Donald Trump announced the United States recognition of Jerusalem as the capital of Israel, prompting condemnation by other world leaders as well as the 2018 Gaza border protests. The new United States Embassy opened in Jerusalem on 14 May 2018.

Israeli normalization with Gulf states and Sudan

The Arab–Israeli alliance against Iran emerged by November 2017, upon warming ties between Israel and the Gulf States and received broad media attention in light of the February 2019 Warsaw Conference. The coordination took place in light of the mutual regional security interests of Israel and Sunni Arab States led by Saudi Arabia, and their standoff against Iranian interests across the Middle East - the Iran–Israel proxy conflict and the Iran–Saudi Arabia proxy conflict. The Arab states participating in the coordination group are the core of the Gulf Cooperation Council. Those include Saudi Arabia, United Arab Emirates and Oman. In 2018, Israeli Prime Minister Benjamin Netanyahu led a delegation to Oman and met with Sultan Qaboos and other senior Omani officials.

In February 2020, Israeli Prime Minister Benjamin Netanyahu and the Chairman of the Sovereignty Council of Sudan, Abdel Fattah al-Burhan, met in Uganda, where they both agreed to normalize the ties between the two countries. Later that month, Israeli planes were allowed to fly over Sudan. This was followed by the Abraham Accords which were agreed to by Israel and the United Arab Emirates (UAE) on 13 August 2020, and Bahrain shortly thereafter. The treaty was intended to settle relations between the two countries. Concurrently, Israel agreed to suspend plans for the annexation of the Jordan Valley.

Notable wars and violent events

Cost of conflict

A report by the Strategic Foresight Group estimated the opportunity cost of conflict for the Middle East from 1991 to 2010 at $12 trillion. The report's opportunity cost calculates the peace GDP of countries in the Middle East by comparing the current GDP to the potential GDP in times of peace. Israel's share is almost $1 trillion, with Iraq and Saudi Arabia having approximately $2.2 and $4.5 trillion, respectively. For example, had there been peace and cooperation between Israel and Arab League nations since 1991, the average Israeli citizen would be earning over $44,000 instead of $23,000 in 2010.

In terms of the human cost, it is estimated that the conflict has taken 92,000 lives (74,000 military and 18,000 civilian from 1945 to 1995).

See also

References

Further reading

Associated Press, comp. (1996). Lightning Out of Israel: [The Six-Day War in the Middle East]: The Arab-Israeli Conflict. Commemorative Ed. Western Printing and Lithographing Company for the Associated Press. ASIN B000BGT89M.
Bard, Mitchell (1999). Middle East Conflict. Indianapolis: Alpha Books. .
Barzilai, Gad (1996). Wars, Internal Conflicts and Political Order: A Jewish Democracy in the Middle East. Albany: State University of New York Press. 
Brown, Wesley H. & Peter F. Penner (ed.): Christian Perspectives on the Israeli-Palestinian Conflict. Neufeld Verlag, Schwarzenfeld 2008. .
Carter, Jimmy (2006). Palestine: Peace Not Apartheid. New York: Simon & Schuster. .
Casper, Lionel L. (2003). Rape of Palestine and the Struggle for Jerusalem. New York & Jerusalem: Gefen Publishing House. .
Citron, Sabina (2006). The Indictment: The Arab-Israeli Conflict in Historical Perspective. New York & Jerusalem: Gefen Publishing House. .

Dershowitz, Alan (2004). The Case for Israel. New York: John Wiley & Sons. .
Falk, Avner (2004). Fratricide in the Holy Land: A Psychoanalytic View of the Arab-Israeli Conflict. Madison: U of Wisconsin P. 

Finkelstein, Norman G. (2003). Image and Reality of the Israel-Palestine Conflict. Verso Books. .
Goldenberg, Doron (2003). State of Siege. Gefen Publishing House. .
Gopin, Marc. (2002). Holy War, Holy Peace: How Religion Can Bring Peace to the Middle East. Oxford University Press. .

Howell, Mark (2007). What Did We Do to Deserve This? Palestinian Life under Occupation in the West Bank, Garnet Publishing. 
Israeli, Raphael (2002). Dangers of a Palestinian State. New York & Jerusalem: Gefen Publishing House. .
Katz, Shmuel (1973). Battleground: Fact and Fantasy in Palestine. Shapolsky Pub. .

–––. (September 1990). "The Roots of Muslim Rage." The Atlantic Monthly.
Maoz, Zeev (2006). Defending the Holy Land. Ann Arbor: University of Michigan. 

Morris, Benny (2009). 1948: A History of the First Arab-Israeli War, Yale University Press. 
Reiter, Yitzhak (2009). National Minority, Regional Majority: Palestinian Arabs Versus Jews in Israel (Syracuse Studies on Peace and Conflict Resolution), Syracuse University Press (Sd). 
Pressman, Jeremy (2020). The Sword is Not Enough: Arabs, Israelis, and the Limits of Military Force, Manchester University Press. 
 Quandt, William B. "Lyndon Johnson and the June 1967 war: what color was the light?." Middle East Journal 46.2 (1992): 198–228. online on US strategy
Rogan, Eugene L., ed., and Avi Shlaim, ed. (2001). The War for Palestine: Rewriting the History of 1948. Cambridge: Cambridge UP. .
Segev, Tom (1999). One Palestine Complete: Jews and Arabs Under British Mandate. New York: Henry Holt & Co. .
 Ziv, Guy. Why hawks become doves: Shimon Peres and foreign policy change in Israel (SUNY Press, 2014).

External links

 
20th century in Asia